Dundee is the fourth-largest city in Scotland by population. A large number of places round the world, often linked to the Scottish diaspora, now share its name.

Dundee may also refer to:

Places

Australia 
 Dundee, New South Wales, a rural locality

Canada 
 Dundee, New Brunswick, a community
 Dundee, Nova Scotia, a community
 Dundee, Quebec, a township municipality

Scotland 
 Dundee (Parliament of Scotland constituency)
 Dundee (UK Parliament constituency), a former parliamentary constituency (1832-1950)

United States 
 Dundee, Alabama, an unincorporated place
 Dundee, Florida, a town
 Dundee, Illinois
 Dundee, Indiana, an unincorporated community
 Dundee, Iowa, a city
 Dundee, Kansas, an unincorporated community 
 Dundee, Kentucky, an unincorporated community
 Dundee, Michigan, a village
 Dundee, Minnesota, a city
 Dundee, Mississippi, an unincorporated community
 Dundee, Missouri, an unincorporated community
 Dundee, Nebraska, a neighborhood in Omaha, Nebraska
 Dundee Dell, a bar and restaurant in Omaha
 Dundee, New York, a village
 Dundee, Ohio,  a census-designated place
 Dundee, Oklahoma, an unincorporated community
 Dundee, Oregon, a city
 Dundee, Texas, an unincorporated place
 Dundee, Virginia, an unincorporated community
 Dundee, Wisconsin, an unincorporated community
 Dundee Township, Illinois
 Dundee Township, Michigan
 Dundee Township, Walsh County, North Dakota
 Dundee Canal, New Jersey, an industrial canal from 1861 to c. the 1930s

Elsewhere 
 Dundee, KwaZulu-Natal, South Africa, a town
 Dundee Island, Antarctica

Businesses 
 Dundee Brewing Company, a Rochester, New York–based beer brewery
 Dundee Corporation, a Canadian financial, real estate and mining holding company
 Dundee Shipbuilders Company, a defunct shipbuilding company which was based in Dundee, Scotland

Maritime vessels 
 , an armed boarding steamer of the First World War
 , a sloop of the Second World War
 , a British steam passenger and cargo ship torpedoed in the First World War
 Dundee (ship), a ship wrecked off the coast of New South Wales, Australia in 1808

Sports 
 Dundee F.C.
 Dundee United F.C.
 Dundee Handball Club
 Dundee HSFP, Scottish rugby union team
 Dundee Sports Dome, Moncton, New Brunswick, Canada

Schools 
 University of Dundee, one of Scotland's main universities
 Dundee College, a former College in Dundee, Scotland, now part of Dundee and Angus College
 Dundee High School (disambiguation)

Titles 
 Earl of Dundee a title in the Peerage of Scotland
 Viscount of Dundee, a defunct title in the Peerage of Scotland

People 
 Dundee (surname)

Other 
 Dundee cake, a type of fruitcake
 Michael "Crocodile" Dundee, the title character of the "Crocodile Dundee" series of films
 'Dundee', tune to which the hymn I To The Hills Will Lift Mine Eyes (Psalm 121) is usually sung
 Dundee Institute of Architects, a professional body for architects based in Dundee, Scotland
 The Dundee Society, group of U.S. National Security Agency cryptologists and cryptanalysts who completed American cryptography pioneer Lambros D. Callimahos' CA-400 class from the mid-1950s to the late 1970s
 Dundee International Book Prize, a UK prize for debut novelists
 Dundee, a fictional cat in "The Pirate's Chest" bookstore in the Cat Who series by Lilian Jackson Braun
 Dundee (Succession), a second-series episode of the HBO television show Succession

See also 
 Upper Dundee, New Brunswick, an unincorporated community
 New Dundee, Ontario, Canada, a community
 East Dundee, Illinois, United States, a village
 West Dundee, Illinois, United States, a village
 Dundy (disambiguation)